Stylips (stylized as StylipS) is a Japanese pop idol group, specialized in performing anime soundtracks.

Career
In 2011, four voice actresses: Arisa Noto, Yui Ogura (from the pop idol group YuiKaori), Kaori Ishihara (also from YuiKaori) and Maho Matsunaga, formed their new musical project.
On December 18, they made their first appearance with the song .

On February 8, 2012, they made their major debut with their single "Study x Study", which is used as the ending theme to the 2012 TV anime High School DxD. Their second single "Miracle Rush" was released on May 16, 2012 and is used as the opening theme to the 2012 anime Saki Achiga-hen Episode of Side-A. On August 22, they released their third single "Choose me Darling", which is the opening theme to the 2012 anime Nakaimo - My Sister Is Among Them!.

On April 20, 2013 it was announced that both Yui Ogura and Kaori Ishihara would graduate from StylipS on the 21st of April to focus on studies and in their career as voice actors. April 28, new members, Moe Toyota and Miku Itō, were announced to join the group. The new members were personally picked by Arisa and Maho. The two were also both from Style Cube Kenshuusei.

Their fourth single "Prism Sympathy" was released on July 16, 2013 and is used as the ending theme to the 2013 anime Fate/kaleid liner Prisma Illya, featuring the new lineup with Moe and Miku.

Their fifth single "Nova Revolution" was released on February 26, 2014 and is used as the ending theme to the 2014 Original Net Anime Donyatsu

Their sixth single "Junsui na Fujunbutsu/Spica" was released on May 24, 2014 and is used as the opening and ending theme to the 2014 anime The Comic Artist and His Assistants

Their Seventh single "Mayomayo Compass wa Iranai" was released on March 4, 2015 and is used as the second ending theme of the 2014 anime Gundam Build Fighters Try

Their Eighth single "Give Me Secret", which was released on May 27, 2015, is used as the ending theme to the 2015 anime High School DxD BorN

On May 23, 2016, StylipS announced that Maho Matsunaga has graduated from the group and retired from voice acting to pursue other work, including DJing.

Members

 Current
Arisa Noto
Moe Toyota
Miku Itou

 Former
Yui Ogura
Kaori Ishihara
Maho Matsunaga

 Timeline

Discography

Albums

Anniversary Albums

Best Album

Singles

See also
 Ro-Kyu-Bu!
 YuiKaori
 HAPPY!STYLE Rookies

References

External links
 Official website 
 StylipS（Lantis web site）
 StylipS | Artist | Lantis web site
 

Anime musical groups
Japanese dance music groups
Japanese pop music groups
Lantis (company) artists
Musical groups established in 2011
2011 establishments in Japan
Japanese girl groups
Musical groups from Tokyo